"I Wish You'd Stay" is a song co-written and recorded by American country music singer Brad Paisley.  It was released in August 2002 as the fourth and final single from Paisley's album Part II and reached a peak of number 7 on the Billboard Hot Country Singles & Tracks chart in early 2003. The song was originally released as the b-side to Paisley's previous single, "I'm Gonna Miss Her (The Fishin' Song)."  Paisley wrote this song with Chris DuBois.

Content
The song is a ballad, in which the narrator states that he hopes his significant other finds love when they leave his side, but he wishes the person would stay with him.

Music video
The music video was directed by Brad Paisley and Devin Pense and premiered on November 11, 2002 on CMT.

Personnel
 Eddie Bayers – drums
 Glen Duncan – fiddle
 Kevin "Swine" Grantt – bass guitar
 Bernie Herms – piano, keyboards, string arrangements
 Wes Hightower – background vocals
 Mike Johnson – steel guitar
 Mitch McMitchen – percussion
 Brad Paisley – lead vocals, electric guitar, acoustic guitar, 6 string tic tac
 Justin Williamson – mandolin
Strings by Carl Gorodetsky and the Nashville String Machine

Chart performance
"I Wish You'd Stay" debuted at number 59 on the U.S. Billboard Hot Country Singles & Tracks for the week of August 17, 2002.

Year-end charts

References

2002 singles
Brad Paisley songs
Songs written by Brad Paisley
Songs written by Chris DuBois
Song recordings produced by Frank Rogers (record producer)
Arista Nashville singles
2001 songs